Michael Frederick Horswill (born  6 March 1953 in Annfield Plain, County Durham) is a former English professional footballer, who played for Sunderland, Manchester City, Plymouth Argyle, Hull City, Happy Valley of Hong Kong and Carlisle United where he finished his career.

Playing career
He started his footballing career at Sunderland at the age of just 12, until he signed as a youth player at 15 years old. In 1971, he signed his professional contract at the club, and made his debut on 4 April 1972 against Preston North End in a 3–1 win. His first goal in a Sunderland shirt came against Middlesbrough on 17 February 1973, when Sunderland won 4–0. Horswill played a role in Sunderland's run in their 1972–73 FA Cup run, as he played in every game, including the final of the tournament, where Sunderland, a Second Division side at the time, beat Leeds United 1–0. In total, he played 69 league games for the club, scoring three goals, before he moved on to Manchester City. While at Manchester City, he played rarely, making just 14 league appearances in two seasons at the club, without scoring a goal. He was then offloaded to Plymouth Argyle in 1975, where he established himself as a regular in the team, going on to eventually make 102 appearances, with three goals. He then moved to Hull City in 1978, where he went on to score six goals, in 84 league appearances. This was followed by a brief spell in Hong Kong, with Happy Valley, before he finished his playing career with Carlisle United, making a solitary appearance.

Broadcasting career
After ending his footballing career, Horswill worked for Real Radio North East as a presenter of the station's Legends Football Phone-In, alongside Malcolm Macdonald and Bernie Slaven. The programme was axed after the 2011–12 season but was resurrected by Darlington-based station Star Radio North East, with Macdonald and Slaven joining Horswill again.

Honours
Sunderland
FA Cup: 1973

References

External links
Official Sunderland A.F.C Profile
Profile at Real Radio North East

1953 births
Living people
People from Annfield Plain
Footballers from County Durham
English footballers
Association football midfielders
Sunderland A.F.C. players
Manchester City F.C. players
Plymouth Argyle F.C. players
Hull City A.F.C. players
Happy Valley AA players
Carlisle United F.C. players
Expatriate footballers in Hong Kong
English expatriate sportspeople in Hong Kong
FA Cup Final players